Valentina Scafaru-Sturza (born 1929) is a Moldovan activist. She is the head of the Association of former deportees and political detainees.

Biography 
Valentina Sturza was born in Ciuciuleni to Alexandra Scafaru and Grigore Scafaru. After the Soviet occupation of Bessarabia and Northern Bukovina, she was loaded in cattle cars and deported to Sverdlovsk.

She is accountant-economist, the chair of the Association of former deportees and political detainees.

She was a candidate of the Party Alliance Our Moldova for July 2009 Moldovan parliamentary election.

References

External links 
 „Istoria dacă n-o cunoaştem nici prezentul nu-i la locul lui”
 REGELE L-A DECORAT, STALIN L-A DEPORTAT
 Valentina Sturza
 Alexandra Scafaru
 Valentina Sturza

1929 births
Romanian people of Moldovan descent
Living people
People from Hîncești District
Eastern Orthodox Christians from Romania
Moldovan anti-communists
Moldovan activists